"The Telephantasm" is a single by the American rock band Soundgarden. The single was released on Black Friday, November 26, 2010. The track has also appeared as a bonus track of the deluxe edition of Telephantasm upon purchasing the full album download from iTunes. The song was mostly recorded during sessions for Screaming Life in 1987 and was remixed by Steve Fisk in 2010.

Track listing (7" vinyl single)

Charts

References

2010 singles
Soundgarden songs
Songs written by Kim Thayil
Song recordings produced by Chris Cornell
Song recordings produced by Matt Cameron
1987 songs